"Bad Blood" is the seventh episode of the Once Upon a Time spin-off series Once Upon a Time in Wonderland.

Plot

As Alice and the Knave of Hearts make a rescue plan to get Cyrus off of Jafar's floating island, Jafar brings Edwin (Alice's father) to Wonderland and assumes his form to get Alice to use her second wish. In a flashback, Jafar meets his father, the Sultan, which leads to the events that made Jafar into the villain he is today.

Production
Jane Espenson was the writer for the episode, while Ciaran Donnelly was its director.

Reception

Ratings
The episode was watched by 3.24 million American viewers, and received an 18-49 rating/share of 0.9/3, down in total viewers but roughly the same demo as the previous episode. The show placed fifth in its timeslot and twelfth for the night.

Critical reception
Amy Ratcliffe of IGN gave the episode an 8.4 out of 10, giving it a positive review. She said: "Even though we didn't get much closer to Cyrus (their reunion is going to have to be epic at this point - no pressure), tonight's installment packed plenty of emotional punches and action. The overall story was one that kept you in a state of constant anticipation of the next scene. "Bad Blood" wasn't epic, but it was fun and satisfying."

Christine Orlando of TV Fanatic gave the episode a 4.3 out of 5, signaling positive reviews. David Griffin of Screen Rant also gave the episode a positive review.

References

External links
 

2013 American television episodes
Once Upon a Time in Wonderland episodes